The mandarin vole (Lasiopodomys mandarinus) is a species of vole found in central China as well as the southern and central Korean Peninsula.  An adult mandarin vole is typically of about 115 millimeters in length, in addition to about 28 mm of tail.  It is smaller and darker in color than the reed vole, Microtus fortis.

References

Mammals of Korea
Lasiopodomys
Mammals described in 1871